, originally known as , was a Japanese noble of the early Heian period.

Life 
In this period, he also held various posts in the imperial guard and as a regional administrator. In 790 Mamichi appealed to have his family's rank increased from muraji to ason, and was granted the new family name of Sugano no Ason, based on his place of residence.

Thanks to the confidence of Emperor Kanmu, Mamichi was able to hold increasingly important positions in the imperial guard and the daijō-kan. He was also deeply involved as an assistant director in the construction of the new capital at Heian-kyō.

Along with Fujiwara no Tsuginawa and Akishino no Yasuhito, Mamichi worked on the compilation and editing of the Shoku Nihongi, completing its 40 volumes in 797. In 805, he joined the ranks of the kugyō with a promotion to sangi. Later that year, he held , in which Otsugu argued that the planned campaign against the Emishi in the north and construction of the capital were overburdening the populace and should be stopped. Mamichi was strongly opposed to this, but the Emperor was convinced by Otsugu's argument, and the plans were halted.

In 807, the  police force was established, and Mamichi placed in charge of the San'indō region. In 811, during the reign of Emperor Saga, Mamichi reached the age of 70 and retired from his post as sangi.

Genealogy 
According to the Shinsen Shōjiroku, Mamichi was descended from the 14th king of Baekje, Geungusu of Baekje.

Father: 
Mother: Unknown
Son:  - Poet, one work in the Kokin Wakashū
Son: 
Daughter: 
Daughter: Wife of

References 

741 births
814 deaths
People of Heian-period Japan